Situation Comedy is an album by Euros Childs, released in October 2013. It is his ninth solo album, released by his record label National Elf Records.

Track listing 
"Tête À Tête" – 2:52
"Second Home Blues" – 2:22
"Avon Lady" – 2:57
"Ooh La Oona" – 3:41
"Brides in the Bath" – 2:23 y
"Give the Girl a Hand / The Peanut Vendor" – 2:20
"Holiday from Myself" – 4:40
"Tina Said" – 3:19
"Daddy's Girl" – 4:24
"Good Time Baby (Talk to Me)" – 4:55
"Trick of the Mind" – 13:40

Personnel 
Euros Childs – lead vocals, piano, synthesizer
Stephen Black – bass, clarinet, saxophone
Stuart Kidd – drums
Marco Rea – electric guitar
Laura J Martin – flute

References 

2013 albums
Euros Childs albums